Smile...You're Under Arrest! is a reality television series on the Fox Reality Channel. On the show, individuals with outstanding felony warrants are lured into police custody using various fake scenarios.

The series consisted of 3 episodes, the first of which aired on December 27, 2008. The show was mentioned on episode 23 of the 4th Season of Last Week Tonight with John Oliver.

Format
The show describes itself as a cross between Cops and Punk’d, setting up elaborate sting operations to snare people wanted on outstanding warrants.  These sting operations include opportunities for felons to work as an extra on a movie set or as a model in a fashion shoot, among others. Once the trap is set and the actors have had their fun with the unsuspecting criminals, police officers arrest and take them to jail.

All of the cases featured in Smile...You’re Under Arrest! involved the Maricopa County Sheriff’s Department  of Phoenix, AZ under the command of Sheriff Joe Arpaio, who was known as “The Toughest Sheriff in America”. He had a reputation for unusual law enforcement tactics such as re-instituting chain gangs, housing prisoners in a desert “tent city” and forcing them to wear pink underwear.  Sheriff Joe Arpaio lost his re-election campaign in 2016; his last day in office was January 1, 2017.

The persons lured into the elaborate ruses are all nonviolent persons with outstanding warrants for low-level crimes. Arpaio claimed that these stings provided a unique service to his community.  Detractors said this was simple self-aggrandizement on the part of Arpaio resulting in no improvement in public safety.

Cast

 Sheriff Joe Arpaio
 Diana Terranova
 David Storrs
 Tori Meyer
 Dave Sheridan

Episodes

References

External links 
 

2000s American reality television series
2008 American television series debuts
2009 American television series endings